The Frasers of Huntingdonshire, of Scottish origin and emerging initially from the town of Bedford in the latter part of the nineteenth century, were a family of artists, known largely for their watercolour paintings, the predominant subject matter of which was the rural landscape of The Fens. Two of the family made illustrations for books and magazines.

Six of the group were the sons of an army surgeon, Major Robert Winchester Fraser (1819–1892) and his wife Mary Ann Anderson (1820–1898), who married in 1842 and produced a total of nine children. There was one son, Michie, who worked for the Consular Service and remained a bachelor. One of his sisters, Catherine, was his housekeeper. There is a suggestion that she and the other sister Margaret may also have painted.

The artists 
The first Fraser to paint was Francis Arthur (1846–1924), generally known as Frank. He was a prolific illustrator; notable publications with his drawings include Great Expectations (Chapman and Hall, 1871), King Arthur and his Knights of the Round Table by Henry Frith (George Routledge, 1884), Mark Twain's Roughing It and The Innocents At Home (Chatto & Windus, 1897), A Hero. Philip’s Book by Dinah Maria Mulock Craik (George Routledge, 1889) and a number of books by Maria Edgeworth, published by George Routledge. 

Next was Robert Winchester Fraser (1848–1906), who received a degree of recognition in his own lifetime, generally signing his work 'R. W. Fraser'. His pictures were regularly exhibited, including at the Royal Academy and Royal Scottish Academy. He was more widely travelled than his artistic siblings, at one point receiving a commission to go and paint in Jamaica. He died while staying at the Bristol Hotel, Gibraltar.

Both his sons were also painters. The elder, Robert James Winchester Fraser (1872–1930) signed his pictures 'R. Winter' or 'Robert Winter', to distinguish them from those by his father. Though less commercially successful than his father, Winter’s paintings have come to be well regarded and these days tend to sell at higher prices in auction. The Dictionary of British Watercolour Artists calls him "the best known, and perhaps the best, of the family".

The younger son, Francis Gordon Fraser (1879–1931) "was probably the most prolific, yet least recorded member of the famous Huntingdonshire family of landscape painters" (Jeremy Wood, Hidden Talents). "The quality of his work is variable and this has affected its value." Perhaps realising that he was in danger of flooding the market single-handedly, he signed his work in a variety of ways. Besides F. G. Fraser, he is known to have also used F. Gordon, Alex Gordon and quite possibly several other names. His huge output was driven by penury and it would seem that many of his paintings were hurriedly completed, though there are a few in circulation of a higher standard and with greater attention to detail. It is not known how much time he spent in or around The Fens region where his brother and uncles lived. His pictures of the area may possibly have been depicted from memory, imagination or his recollection of his father’s work, given that he mostly lived in south-west London. Two of his pictures were shown at the Devon and Exeter Annual Exhibition in 1907.

Like his nephew, Garden William Fraser (1856–1921) struggled with his finances and saw little return on his now very collectable paintings. Declared bankrupt in 1899, his money difficulties almost certainly contributed to the marital problems he endured with his wife Ethel. Together they produced 6 children but by 1906, Ethel had lost patience with the struggling artist and removed herself and the children to Birmingham. Garden William lived the rest of his life in a room at the Old Ferry Boat Inn in Holywell, Cambridgeshire. His distinctive work, which often has an almost photographic quality, is usually signed W. F. Garden; he may have adopted this version of his name not only to distinguish it from the rest of his family, but also to confuse creditors. Perhaps his most famous work is The Wood At Dusk, which is available in reproduction.

George Gordon Fraser (1859–1895), like his eldest brother Frank, showed great promise as an illustrator. His drawings and cartoons appeared in Fun magazine and he provided "upwards of one hundred and twenty illustrations" for an 1891 edition of Jerome K. Jerome's The Diary of a Pilgrimage. A reprinted version of this is still available though fails to credit G.G. Fraser as the artist. He also painted, in watercolours and occasionally in oils, signing 'G. Gordon Fraser' or using his initials. William Andrew Baird Grove, in his booklet The Frasers – A Local Family of Artists (1980) describes George Gordon's work as "a wide variety of Fen scenes of painstaking detail and accuracy, no longer fashionable in today's art. His brushwork was very fine and it appears that every single twig and every leaf is given individual attention." There are noticeably fewer examples of his work in circulation as he died young, at the age of 35, having fallen through the ice while skating on the River Ouse. He was buried with his father in a secluded spot in the graveyard of St. James's Church, Hemingford Grey, a village between Huntingdon and St. Ives, Cambridgeshire.

Besides following his older brothers into the uncertain life of an artist, Arthur Anderson Fraser (1861–1904) was also an enthusiastic participant in the Neo-Jacobite Revival, founding a "White Cockade" club at the Ferry Boat Inn at Holywell. He married Margaret Lawson in 1885 and the couple had two sons, the elder of whom, Francis McGreigor, may also have dabbled in painting. As an artist, Arthur Anderson was particularly successful in capturing the distinctive morning and evening skies of the Huntingdonshire and Cambridgeshire landscape. His work is either signed by name or by the use of a small monogram joining the letters A and F.

Gilbert Baird Fraser (1865–1947) was the youngest and longest surviving member of the artistic family, outliving all his brothers and Robert Winchester’s sons. Like Arthur, he was involved with the Neo-Jacobites, standing for Parliament on a Jacobite platform in 1891. He lived with his wife May Heseltine at Reed Cottage in Holywell, Cambridgeshire, creating a considerable body of work, much of it with a somewhat warmer palette of colour than other family members. He is buried beside his brother Arthur Anderson and nephew Robert James Winchester in the churchyard at Holywell.

References 

Huntingdon
Scottish families
English watercolourists
Scottish watercolourists
Artist families